Lysol (spelled Lizol in India) is a brand of American cleaning and disinfecting products distributed by Reckitt, which markets the similar Dettol or Sagrotan in other markets. The line includes liquid solutions for hard and soft surfaces, air treatment, and hand washing. The active ingredient in many Lysol products is benzalkonium chloride, but the active ingredient in the Lysol "Power and Free" line is hydrogen peroxide. Lysol has been used since its invention in the late 19th century as a household and industrial cleaning agent, and previously as a medical disinfectant.

History

The first Lysol Brand Antiseptic Disinfectant was introduced in 1889 by Gustav Raupenstrauch to help end a cholera epidemic happening in Germany. The original formulation of Lysol contained cresols. This formulation may still be available commercially in some parts of the world.
Formulations containing chlorophenol are still available in the United Kingdom.

In 1911, poisoning by drinking Lysol was the most common means of suicide in Australia and New York. One of the active ingredients, benzalkonium chloride, is highly toxic to fish (LC50 = 280 μg ai/L), very highly toxic to aquatic invertebrates (LC50 = 5.9 μg ai/L), moderately toxic to birds (LD50 = 136 mg/kg-bw), and slightly toxic ("safe") to mammals (LD50 = 430 mg/kg-bw).

Use during the 1918 Spanish flu pandemic
In 1918, during the Spanish flu pandemic, Lehn & Fink, Inc. advertised Lysol disinfectant as an effective countermeasure to the influenza virus. Newspaper advertisements provided tips for preventing the spread of the disease, including washing sick-rooms with Lysol, as well as everything that came in contact with patients. A small (US50¢) bottle made  of disinfectant solution, and a smaller (US25¢) bottle made . The company also advertised the "unrefined" Lysol F. & F. (Farm & Factory) for use in factories and other large buildings – a  can, when diluted as directed, made  of disinfecting solution.

Use as an abortifacient
Earlier formulations of Lysol contained cresol, a compound that can induce abortions, and it was widely used by women who could not otherwise obtain legal abortions in the United States, although the medical community was relatively unaware of the phenomenon for the first half of the 20th century. By the 1960s, published medical literature had acknowledged the common use of Lysol and other soaps to induce abortions, which could lead to fatal renal failure and sepsis.

Product innovations
 1930: Lysol Brand Disinfectant Liquid was introduced to drug stores and hospitals.
 1957/58 Lysol purchased the rights to private label National Laboratories, Inc's Disinfectant spray. 
 1962: Lysol released the Lysol Disinfectant Spray, which used a new method of aerosol application. 
 1968: Lysol began creating bathroom cleaners and released the Lysol Toilet Bowl Cleaner. 
 1985: Lysol All Purpose Cleaner was released.  
 1988: Lysol began shipping aerosol disinfectants to humid areas such as Houston, to combat occupational lung diseases, (also known as "lung rot").
 2000: Pre-moistened Lysol Brand Disinfecting Wipes was released, a cleaning wipe for use on hard, non-porous surfaces.  
 2009: Lysol began producing hand soaps.
Ownership: Lehn & Fink was acquired by Sterling Drug in 1967 and Reckitt & Colman acquired L&F in 1994 when Bayer acquired Sterling-Winthrop.  As of 2015 Lysol products were distributed by Reckitt Benckiser LLC of Parsippany, New Jersey.

Ingredients

Different Lysol products contain different active ingredients.  Examples of active ingredients used in Lysol products:

 ethanol/SD Alcohol, 40 1–3%; fluid that acts as sanitizer
 isopropyl alcohol, 1–2%; partly responsible for Lysol's strong odor; acts as sanitizing agent and removes odor
 p-Chloro-o-benzylphenol, 5–6%; antiseptic
 o-Phenylphenol, 0.1%; antiseptic; in use circa 1980s
 potassium hydroxide, 3–4%
 Potassium hydroxide is a highly corrosive chemical when used at higher concentrations. It is primarily dangerous to eyes, skin, respiratory tract, and gastrointestinal tract. It can cause serious burns and can be fatal if swallowed. Inhalation, dermal contact, and ingestion are the main forms of exposure. This substance is often found in various bathroom products for hair and skincare, but in a way that maintains and balances the pH level. Potassium hydroxide is not carcinogenic and does not prove to be dangerous for reproductive health. 
 Alkyl (50% C14, 40% C12, 10% C16) dimethylbenzyl ammonium saccharinate, 0.10%; microbiocide
 Alkyl (C12-C18) dimethylbenzylammonium chloride, 0.08%; antiseptic
 Alkyl (C12-C16) dimethylbenzylammonium chloride, 0.02%; antiseptic
 lactic acid as an antiseptic.
 hydrogen peroxide
Health Effects of Active Ingredients in Lysol

 Benzalkonium Chloride: Benzalkonium is an active ingredient in Lysol and is considered to be acutely toxic Exposure to this chemical can have a lot of side effects. Some of these effects can include rashes, allergic reactions, rashes, swelling in the mouth, eyes, and throat, diarrhea and vomiting.

 Being exposed to Benzalkonium Chloride for a long amount of time will also begin to cause itchiness in your eyes, respiratory effects, and will affect your digestive system. 
 Other items that contain Benzalkonium chloride: Bath and body products, such as soap and shampoo. This chemical is also found in many other cleaning products. 
 To avoid this product, limit the use of them around your house, especially if there is not ventilation. Also, make sure to read the label of the product.

Wednesday, November 29, 2017 by Rita Winters

Benzalkonium chloride (BAK

Health Effects of P-chloro-o-benzylphenol 
Lysol contains P-chloro-o-benzylphenol at a 5-6% concentration. It is a chemical that is absorbed in humans through ingestion and the mucus membranes. The Globally Harmonized System of Classification of Labelling of Chemicals (GHS) has released hazard statements on P-chloro-o-benzylphenol that include and are not limited to “skin irritation, allergic skin reaction, causes serious eye damage, harmful if inhaled, suspected of causing cancer, suspected of damaging fertility,  and potentially causes damage to organs through prolonged or repeated exposure”.

SARS-CoV-2 inactivating capability 
According to their website, some of Lysol's products "have been tested by an independent third party and approved by the EPA to kill SARS-CoV-2, the cause of COVID-19, on hard, non-porous surfaces."
Health Effects of Active Ingredients in Lysol
Benzalkonium chloride:

Risk of Misuse During COVID-19 Pandemic 
However, while Lysol contains disinfecting properties, risks of misuse during the heightened sanitation practices of the COVID-19 pandemic do exist. Overuse, misuse, and improper mixing of disinfectant ingredients can cause both  acute and chronic effects.

During the COVID-19 pandemic, more surfaces were being disinfected such as "touch-screens, plastics, rubber, adhesives, stainless steel and other metals" 

 Acute health effects: cough, shortness of breath, burning and watery eyes, and runny nose, acute skin irritation 
 Chronic effects: long-term exposure of fragrances and sanitizers in Lysol can "trigger asthma and allergies"

Products
 Disinfectants: Lysol Disinfectant products are used to kill surface and air bacteria. Products include:
 Lysol Disinfectant Spray*:  "Alkyl (50% C14, 40% C12, 10% C16) Dimethyl Benzyl Ammonium Saccharinate= 0.10% Ethanol= 58.00%, Other Ingredients= 41.90% (total 100%)"
 Lysol Disinfecting Wipes
 Lysol Concentrate Disinfectant 
 Lysol Laundry Disinfectant - contains: didecyl-dimethyl ammonium chloride and dimethyl benzyl ammonium chloride - claims effiacy against P. aeruginosa and COVID-19, with 99.99% (one extra "9", compared to most other Lysol products) effectiveness against all viruses and bacteria.
 Cleaners: Lysol distributes several multi-purpose cleaners, kitchen cleaners, and bathroom cleaners. These include:
 Lysol Power & Free
 Lysol All-Purpose Cleaner
 Lysol Multi-Surface Cleaner Pourable
 Lysol Power Kitchen Cleaner
 Lysol Bathroom Cleaner
 Lysol Toilet Bowl Cleaner
 Lysol Mold & Mildew Remover 
 Hand Soaps: Lysol recently developed a line of disinfecting hand soaps. Products include:
 Lysol No Touch Hand Soap System
 Lysol Touch of Foam Hand Wash

Competition
Lysol's major competitors include Clorox, Febreze, Tilex, Oust, Mr. Clean and Pine-Sol.

See also
Bactericide
Disinfectant
Misinformation related to the COVID-19 pandemic
Virucide

References

External links

Official website
History of Lysol
Klerzix Disinfectant Wipes

Reckitt brands
Antiseptics
Cleaning product brands
Products introduced in 1889